Catephia javensis is a species of moth of the  family Erebidae. It is found in Indonesia (Java).

References

Catephia
Moths described in 1926
Moths of Indonesia